The University of Applied Sciences Wiener Neustadt (FHWN for short) is an Austrian Fachhochschule founded in 1994.  It has eight areas of specialization. The main campus is in Wiener Neustadt and two smaller campuses are located in Wieselburg and Tulln (both in Lower Austria).

Austria's first and largest Fachhochschule for business and engineering, the University of Applied Sciences Wiener Neustadt, also called FHWN.

Degree Programs 

The business school also offers a course called "Business Consultancy International", a bachelor's degree program, which is exclusively taught in English.

Another program taught in English is the Aerospace Engineering Master program. This program features an intensive theoretical education but also many possibilities for hands-on learning. One of the most famous example of this approach is the "Small Sat Program". In this program the students develop so-called CubeSats. The first CubeSat of the FHWN was launched in June, 2017 and is since then operating successfully in space. Several other CubeSats are in preparation.

Its MedTech program is also an innovative unique master's degree programme in Europe, taught exclusively in English and organized as a part-time and consequence distance learning study. MedTech combines technical and physical aspects of functional imaging, image processing and therapy planning with its applications in a medical environment.

External links

References 

Universities of Applied Sciences in Austria
Educational institutions established in 1994
1994 establishments in Austria